Walter J. Conrath (January 20, 1907 – May 7, 1942), of Pennsylvania, was a stamp collector who specialized in aerophilately, the study of air mail stamps, and wrote extensively on the subject. His career was cut short when he died in an automobile accident at the age of 35.

Collecting interests
Conrath collected air mail stamps and air mail postal history.

Philatelic literature
Walter Conrath edited and published The Airpost Journal and the American Air Mail Catalogue. He is remembered most for his 1940 book Mail Through the Air: A Review of the Development of Air Mail and Aero-Philately which continued to be republished after his death.

Philatelic activity
In addition to participating in various aerophilatelic societies, Conrath was an early member of the American Air Mail Society and was its president from 1936 to 1938.

Honors and awards
In recognition of his influence in the field of aerophilately, Conrath was elevated to the American Philatelic Society Hall of Fame in 1942.

See also
 Philately
 Philatelic literature

References
 American Philatelic Society Hall of Fame: Walter J. Conrath

1907 births
1942 deaths
Philatelic literature
American philatelists
Engineers from Pennsylvania
American Philatelic Society
20th-century American engineers
Road incident deaths in the United States